Phereoeca uterella is a species of moth belonging to the family Tineidae. It is commonly known as the plaster bagworm but as the term "bagworm" more properly refers to moths of a different family (Psychidae), it is often called the household casebearer – which may in turn refer to the related Phereoeca allutella. It is found in warm, humid climates throughout the Americas although the exact range is difficult to map as it is easily confused with other case-bearing tineids. It is common in houses.

Names
It is called atʃitʃiɁũɨi in the Kwaza language of Rondônia, Brazil.

Description

The adult female has a wingspan of up to 13 mm. The forewings are gray with distinct dark spots and the plain hindwings are fringed with long gray hairs. The male is smaller (wingspan up to 9 mm) and more slender with less distinct markings. The reduced mouthparts suggest this species does not feed as an adult. The female lays up to 200 tiny pale blue eggs in sheltered places.

The larva constructs a protective case from silk and camouflages it with other materials such as soil, sand and insect droppings. When the larva is fully grown, this case is up to 14 mm long (twice the length of the animal) and is noticeably thickened in the middle so that it rather resembles a pumpkin seed. This shape allows the animal to turn around inside the case (the case has openings at both ends, both used by the head of the animal). Pupation occurs within the case.

The main food source for this species appears to be silk, especially spider webs, but also silk produced by other arthropods including discarded cases from the same species. Larvae also feed on dander and fallen human hair. Wool (but not cotton) is also a favoured food and the species can be a household pest.

Whether the moth found on Sri Lanka and described as Tinea pachyspila is a member of this species or a household case-bearing moth (P. allutella) is not unequivocally resolved.

References

External links
 
 household casebearer on the UF / IFAS Featured Creatures Web site

Fauna of the Central African Republic
Insects of the Democratic Republic of the Congo
Moths described in 1897
Moths of Africa
Tineidae